Reynato Puno y Serrano, KGCR (Filipino: Reynato Serrano Puno; born May 17, 1940) is a Filipino jurist. He served as the 22nd Chief Justice of the Supreme Court of the Philippines from December 8, 2006 by President Gloria Macapagal Arroyo until his mandatory retirement on May 17, 2010. Puno had initially been appointed to the Supreme Court as an Associate Justice on June 28, 1993.

Puno was appointed on January 23, 2018 as the chairperson of the Consultative Committee to Review the 1987 Constitution by virtue of Executive Order No. 10.

Puno is also the chairman of the solar energy company named "GenWATT".

Profile

Puno earned his law degree from the University of the Philippines Diliman. During his stay in the state university, he also served as editor of The Philippine Collegian. He would later finish post-graduate studies at Southern Methodist University, Dallas, Texas (Master of Comparative Laws), University of California, Berkeley (Master of Laws), and University of Illinois (finished all academic requirements of the degree of Doctor of Judicial Science).

Puno began his legal career in private practice. In 1969, he joined the law practice of his elder brother Isaac, a future judge whose murder at age 42 remains unsolved to date. In 1971, he joined the Office of the Solicitor General, where he would serve for the next nine years.
In 1980, Puno was appointed by President Ferdinand Marcos as a Justice of the Court of Appeals. He rejoined the executive department in 1984, this time as a Deputy Minister of Justice. Upon the assumption into office of President Corazon Aquino in 1986, Puno was reappointed to the Court of Appeals.

Puno has been praised for his erudite and literary writing style. His predecessor as Chief Justice, Artemio Panganiban, once lauded Puno's writing in the following manner: "Like a trained surgeon, he uses his pen with razor-like precision to separate the excise fabrication from truth and pretension from reality. In the process, he gives life to populist causes and libertarian ideals. Darting, gutsy and erudite, he often wages lonely battles against conventional wisdom with his stirring dissents and insightful opinion." (Panganiban, Justice and Faith, p. 142)

Freemason
Chief Justice Reynato Puno is a freemason and Past Grand Master of the Grand Lodge of the Philippines. MW Reynato S. Puno PGM is from Hiram Lodge No. 88 and also a charter member of Jacques DeMolay Memorial Lodge No.305, and also a dual member of Dagohoy Lodge No. 84.

Supreme Court term

On June 28, 1993, President Fidel V. Ramos appointed Puno as an Associate Justice of the Supreme Court at the age of 53. He would serve in that capacity for the next 13 years. Upon the retirement of Justice Josue Bellosillo in 2003, Puno became the Senior Associate Justice.

Traditionally, the most senior Associate Justice was appointed to fill any permanent vacancy to the seat of the Chief Justice, though this tradition was not always observed. Upon the retirement of Chief Justice Hilario Davide Jr. in 2005, Puno, as the senior Associate Justice, was a leading candidate for appointment as the next Chief Justice. However, President Gloria Macapagal-Arroyo instead appointed Associate Justice Artemio Panganiban as Chief Justice, marking the first time in 20 years that the senior Associate Justice was bypassed.

Justice Puno remained as the most senior Associate Justice for the twelve months of the term of Chief Justice Panganiban. Despite some speculation that President Arroyo would again bypass Puno and appoint either Associate Justice Leonardo Quisumbing or Senator Miriam Defensor Santiago as Chief Justice, Puno was appointed to the post within hours from the retirement of Panganiban. Puno denied speculations that he will retire from the
position of Chief Justice before May 17, 2010.

Performance rating
On January 7, 2008, the Social Weather Stations (November 30 to December 3, 2007) survey released the performance rating of Chief Justice Reynato Puno - 32% satisfied and 34% dissatisfied, or net –2, having been in single digit since March 2007.

Honors
Puno was named one of the Ten Outstanding Young Men (TOYM) of the Philippines award in the field of law in 1977. He was also one of the Outstanding Alumnus of the Alpha Phi Beta fraternity - UP College of Law in 1975. As a member of the Judiciary, he has received honorary doctorates from Wesleyan University Philippines, the Angeles University Foundation, Bulacan State University, Hannam University of South Korea, the Central Philippine University, University of the East, Polytechnic University of the Philippines, University of the Philippines and Silliman University.

In 1996, he was chosen the "Outstanding Alumnus" by the University of the Philippines College of Law.

Justice Puno was also the Supreme Commander of the Order of the Knights of Rizal and was conferred the highest rank, Knight Grand Cross of Rizal (KGCR).

2008 UPAA Most Distinguished Alumnus Awardee
Last June 21, Chief Justice Reynato S. Puno was awarded as the University of the Philippines Alumni Association (UPAA) Most Distinguished Alumnus during the 2008 UPAA Grand Centennial Alumni and Faculty Homecoming and Reunion at the Araneta Coliseum, Cubao, Quezon City with the theme UP and We the Alumni: Excellence, Leadership, and Service in the Next 100 Years.

UP President Emerlinda R. Roman, UP Regents Gari M. Tiongco and Ponciano E. Rivera Jr., and UPAA Board Secretary Marita P. Carag bestowed the award on Chief Justice Puno during the awarding ceremonies of the day-long celebration.

The 2008 UPAA Most Distinguished Alumnus was the top award given by the UPAA "to recognize UP alumni for their outstanding achievements that bring about substantial benefits to society and distinct honor to the University."The UPAA conferred on Chief Justice Puno the award for using his UP education to "contribute to the welfare of the Filipinos and to the larger society."

Chief Justice Puno won over around 200 nominees who were nominated for specific fields of involvement. He was nominated for the Public Service/Good Governance category by two organizations, the Alpha Phi Beta Fraternity Chancery (Alumni Association) and a lawyers' group. The UPAA Awards Screening Committee decided to name Chief Justice Puno Most Distinguished Alumnus in light of the significant impact the Philippine Judiciary has had on the nation since he assumed the Court's highest office.

In his response after the awarding ceremonies, Chief Justice Puno said that he views the awards given to him and fellow alumni, not as personal achievements but as recognition of the UP soul and spirit in their beings. "The UP spirit tells us that what is right and what is wrong is never decided by popular vote; that what is right and what is wrong is not resolved by the demagogueries in the market place. UP taught us the lesson there is no right be wrong, to do wrong and to go wrong," he said.

He also predicted that "UP was pre-eminent in the last 100 years. I have no doubt, it will be preeminent in the next 100 years. We say 'Push On UP,' we are going to win."

As the 2008 UPAA Most Distinguished Alumnus, Chief Justice Puno also spoke at the UP Alumni Council Meeting at the Bahay ng Alumni, UP Diliman, Quezon City last June 20.

At that event, Chief Justice Puno stressed that UP has been "an important center of gravity in our collective efforts to uplift the interest of our people and interlink with humankind's drive towards universal peace and prosperity."

He added that "the role of UP in difficult times will be decisive. It has to serve as our fresh fountain of knowledge and reverse our knowledge deficit. It has to be a laboratory of ideas, where old ideas are given the reverence of immutability, and where new ideas are given a tolerant eye. It must improve the quality of our democracy by helping break the monopoly of power of the elites and by halting their heartlessness to the many who cannot exercise their rights due to involuntary poverty."

In closing, he said that "the UP must maintain its academic freedom, for any institution that searches and stands for truth, that resists expressions of liberty, that holds sacrosanct the right to inquire will most likely be scorned in a society where the powers that reign take comfort in the uniformity of ideas and shun multiformity of thoughts."

An exhibit about Chief Justice Puno was also showcased at the Bahay ng Alumni, UP Diliman, Quezon City, and at the Araneta Coliseum, Cubao, Quezon City on June 20 and 21, respectively. His awards, magazine feature articles, photos, ponencias, and speeches as well as books written about him were displayed in the exhibit.

Chief Justice Puno graduated from the UP College of Law in 1962, with a Bachelor of Science in Jurisprudence degree and a Bachelor of Laws degree.

2008 WPPAC award
The World Peace Prize Awarding Council (WPPAC) Chief Judge and Co-Founder Lester Wolff and WPPAC Executive Judge and Co-Founder Dr. Han Min Su, WPPAC Sec. Gen. Judge Dr. Asher Naim, and WPPAC Judge Dr. Mohammad A. Cholkamy, on October, recognized Puno as 2008 Human Cultural Asset International.

Family

Puno was married to Luzviminda T. Delgado-Puno (1940–2006), a lawyer who had been the Clerk of Court of the Supreme Court from 1993 to 2005. Luz Puno (daughter of Dr. Gregorio and Anastacia Delgado) graduated cum laude (Bachelor of Laws) in 1961 at the University of the East, and passed the Bar examinations of that same year, when she was just 21 years old. Their children and their spouses are Reynato Jr. and Cheryl Mae H. Yap; Emmanuel and Rachelle Catherine Fabreo, and their only daughter Ruth Puno; their three grandchildren are Alessandra Isabelle, Laticia Raquelle and Elijah Rey Puno. Luzviminda D. Puno died at 5:10 am, April 12, 2006 at the St. Luke's Medical Hospital, Quezon City due to complications from heart surgery. On April 25, 2007, Narcisa "Sisang" Serrano Puno, 92, mother of Chief Justice Reynato S. Puno, died at the Philippine Heart Center in Quezon City. Mrs. Puno was the widow of the late attorney Isaac I. Puno Sr. Their children and their spouses were Judge Isaac Puno Jr. (who died due to an assassin's bullet in 1977), and Rosella Jean Makasiar Puno, attorney Leven Puno and Nelly Reyes Puno, Chief Justice Reynato and attorney Luzviminda Delgado Puno, Dr. Carlito Puno and Dr. Magdalena N. Puno, Edwin Puno, Dr. Paul Puno and Procesa Bravo Puno, Dr. Myrna Puno Velasquez and Renato Velasquez, Isaac Puno III and Mary Resurreccion Tiambeng Puno, and Marilyn Puno Santiago and Rolando Santiago, and grandchildren.

Year one

Extrajudicial killings summit
The 22nd Puno Supreme Court held a National Consultative Summit on extrajudicial killings on July 16 and 17, 2007 at the Manila Hotel. Invited representatives from the three branches of the government participated (including the AFP, the PNP, CHR, media, academe, civil society and other stakeholders). Puno gave the keynote speech and closing remarks. Puno searches for major solutions to solve forced disappearances. During the first day of the summit, the speakers presented their respective papers comprising significant inputs from their respective sectors, while on the second day, the participants were broken up into 12 groups (chaired by a Justice) and take part in a workshop. Local and international observers (the diplomatic corps and representatives from various international organizations) were accredited. Puno informed that "the summit highlight will be a plenary session where each of the 12 groups shall report to the body their recommended resolutions. The reports and proposals were synthesized and then transmitted to the concerned government agencies for appropriate action". On the other hand, the earlier slated Malacañang-sponsored Mindanao Peace and Security Summit (July 8–10, 2007 at Cagayan de Oro City), would focus on how to make the anti-terror law, or the Human Security Act (HSA) of 2007, more acceptable to the public. It would probably steal the thunder from Puno's own summit on extrajudicial killings and forced disappearances.

On July 16, 2007, Justices, activists, militant leaders, police officials, politicians and prelates attended the Supreme Court's two-day summit at the Manila Hotel in Manila City to map out ways to put an end to the string of extrajudicial killings in the country. Bayan was set to launch their "silent protest", but expressed support for the high court's initiative. Director Geary Barias, chief of the police's anti-killings Task Force Usig, Sen. Panfilo Lacson, Manila Mayor Alfredo Lim, Caloocan Bishop Deogracias Yñiguez, reelected party-list Representatives Satur Ocampo (Bayan Muna) and Crispin Beltran (Anakpawis) graced the affair. SC Chief Justice Reynato Puno said that the "National Consultative Summit on Extrajudicial Killings and Forced Disappearances: Searching for Solutions," would help stop the murders. Delegates were given 12 to 15 minutes each to share their insights and knowledge about the matter. Yniguez scored the government for failing to actively pursue investigations on the hundreds of killings, and the Catholic Church was alarmed that victims have been deprived of their "fundamental right" to live. Based on Yniguez-church's count, the number of victims of extrajudicial killings reached 778, while survivors of "political assassinations," was pegged at 370. He also noted 203 "massacre" victims, 186 people who involuntarily disappeared, 502 tortured, and others who were illegally arrested. Yniguez similarly criticized the government's alleged insistence to implement its Oplan Bantay Laya I and II, the military's counter-insurgency operation-plans which militants have said consider legal people's organizations as targets. Meanwhile, Bayan urged the Supreme Court to "check serious threats to civil liberties and basic freedoms" including the anti-terror law or the Human Security Act of 2007, which took effect on July 15 despite protests from leftist groups. Vice President Teofisto Guingona Jr. joined Bayan and other leftist groups as petitioners in their formal pleading before the Supreme Court challenging the constitutionality of the law.  Human rights lawyer Edre Olalia of the International Association of People's Lawyers (IAPL) served as lead counsel. Bayan chair Carol Araullo said the respondents included members of the Anti-Terrorism Council headed by Executive Secretary Eduardo Ermita and Raul Gonzalez. Earlier, CBCP president Angel Lagdameo pointed out at least 5 provisions of the law that may threaten civil liberties: Sec. 19 allows detentions of mere suspects for more than three days in the event of an actual or terrorist attack, while Section 26 allows house arrest despite the posting of bail, and prohibits the right to travel and to communicate with others; Sec. 39 allows seizure of assets while Sec. 7 allows surveillance or wiretapping of suspects; Sec. 26 allows the investigation of bank deposits and other assets.

Puno SC summit called for truce, talks with insurgents, as the two-day summit ended: "Let us rather engage in the conspiracy of hope...and hope for peace." Puno said he would forward the summit's recommendation to President Gloria Macapagal Arroyo, the Senate and House of Representatives. "In the clash of arms, the laws are silent. We need to reduce violence, create conditions conducive to less violence based on the rule of law", Associate Justice Conchita Carpio-Morales said in the report. One group recommended that Republic Act 9372 or the Human Security Act be declared unconstitutional. All the groups agreed that insurgency is not only a military but also a political problem and said a ceasefire would be a sign of the government's goodwill and sincerity in forging genuine peace agreements with all rebel groups. They also recommended the use of the third-party approach to peace negotiations. Among the other recommendations of the summit are: -- for the Supreme Court to reexamine the case of Umil v. Ramos, which said rebellion and related crimes are continuing offenses, thus allowing the warrantless arrest of suspects; to carefully study the possibility of creating a new offense for the killings and assaults on journalists, judges and activities, akin to the law penalizing violence against woman and children; the establishment of sanctuaries where victims and witnesses can take refuge; for the President to certify and the Senate to ratify the Rome Statute, which established the International Criminal Court, and Protocol 1 of the Geneva Convention, which addresses the issue of making civilian populations or individual civilians the object of attacks; the enactment of a law addressing and accurately defining extrajudicial killings and enforced disappearances; a study on the use of the writ of Amparo for greater protection of Constitutional rights, and a more creative and resourceful application of the writ of habeas corpus; suspending the presumption of regularity in the performance of official duty in cases of extrajudicial killings and enforced disappearance; studying whether the government can continue invoking its immunity from suspension in cases of extrajudicial killings and enforced disappearances; allowing petitioners for the writ of habeas corpus to seek court orders to search the premises of police and military camps and stations in the presence of a representative from the Commission on Human Rights; requiring the Department of Interior and Local Government (DILG) to take DNA samples of unidentified cadavers for preservation in the Philippine National Police laboratory; the adoption of international standards of command responsibility; the enhancement of moral, ethical and constitutional values that put a premium on tolerance and the rule of law.

The CPP, however said that the abuses will continue "so long as the mastermind remains in power." "Extra-judicial killings and enforced disappearances will continue as long as the mastermind remains in power and enforces a deliberate state terrorist policy that sets the stage for gross violations of human rights." CPP spokesman Gregorio "Ka Roger" Rosal said that the New People's Army (NPA) and people's courts are conducting their own investigations and are intensifying efforts to investigate and resolve particular cases of extrajudicial killings and abductions. Rosal cited the case of Capt. Patrick Baesa, an intelligence officer under the notorious 901st Infantry Battalion, who was meted out revolutionary punishment last November 2006. Baesa, who was based in Irosin, Albay, was responsible for organizing the death squads which carried out the killings of Max Frivaldo, Ding Uy, Rei Mon Guran and Barangay Chairman Neal Futalan."But ultimately it is the Arroyo regime and its top security and military officials who should be punished for these heinous crimes", he said. Further, former vice president Teofisto Guingona and BAYAN petitioned the Court to declare the Human Security Act (HSA) unconstitutional. The 89-page petition for certiorari and prohibition with a prayer for temporary restraining order against the implementation of the anti-terror law. Other petitioners were Gabriela, Kilusang Magbubukid ng Pilipinas, Movement of Concerned Citizens for Civil Liberties, state workers' group COURAGE, Kadamay, Solidarity of Cavite Workers, League of Filipino Students, HEAD, Anakbayan, Pamalakaya, Alliance of Concerned Teachers, Migrante and AGHAM.

Twin horrible deaths happened on / circa the same day last year, January 15, 2007, that the Supreme Court of the Philippines'  (logo or seal) was mysteriously burned into halves by an almost one-hour afternoon fire. Despite different appeals by local and international groups, the spate of extrajudicial killings in the Philippines continued. On January 15, 2008, Reynato Puno condemned the murder of Judge Roberto Navidad, Regional Trial Court, Branch 32, Calbayog, Samar, the 15th judge to be ambushed since July 20, 1999, the 14th under the Arroyo government. Just starting his engine, black Nissan Patrol SUV, Natividad was shot in the face / left eye, at 7:10 p.m. Monday, by a lone gunman, 5'4" tall and medium-built, wearing black jacket, using a 45 caliber pistol. On Tuesday, Catholic missionary Rey Roda, Oblates of Marry Immaculate (OMI), 54, was shot dead at 8:30 p.m., when he resisted abduction attempt by unidentified 10 armed men in a chapel at ikud Tabawan village, South Ubian, Tawi-Tawi, South Ubian. In February 1997, another OMI leader, Bishop Benjamin de Jesus was shot dead in front of the Jolo cathedral. In 2006, the Asian Human Rights Commission stated that there had been 26 priests, pastors, and churchmen who were liquidate or were victims of violence under the Gloria Macapagal Arroyo administration since 2001. This includes 3 priests who were reported killed just in 2007: Basilio Bautista of the Iglesia Filipina Reform Group, in Surigao del Sur, Indonesian priest Fransiskus Madhu, in Kalinga province, and Catholic priest Florante Rigonan, in Ilocos Norte.

Writ of Amparo

On August 17, 2007 Puno said that the writ of amparo (Spanish for protection), would strip the military of the defense of denial (Volunteers Against Crime and Corruption's 9th anniversary celebration at Camp Crame). Under the writ, families of victims would have the right to access information on their cases—a constitutional right called the "habeas data" common in several Latin America countries. The final version of the rule, which was made retroactive, would come out by next month. Puno stated that "In other words, if you have this right, it would be very, very difficult for State agents, State authorities to be able to escape from their culpability."

On September 15, 2007, lawyer Neri Javier Colmenares (National Union of People's Lawyers) announced that the Supreme Court of the Philippines committee on the revision of rules drafted the writ of amparo rules, which were promulgated in October. The writ of amparo (Spanish for protection) is a defense to prevent extrajudicial killings and forced disappearances. As supplement, recourse to "habeas data," to grant  the right of access information on desaparecidos, was also  provided.

Historical promulgation of Writ of Amparo
On September 25, 2007 Chief Justice Reynato Puno officially announced the Supreme Court of the Philippines' approval or promulgation of the Writ of Amparo:  "Today, the Supreme Court promulgated the rule that will place the constitutional right to life, liberty and security above violation and threats of violation. This rule will provide the victims of extralegal killings and enforced disappearances the protection they need and the promise of vindication for their rights. This rule empowers our courts to issue reliefs that may be granted through judicial orders of protection, production, inspection and other relief to safeguard one's life and liberty The writ of amparo shall hold public authorities, those who took their oath to defend the constitution and enforce our laws, to a high standard of official conduct and hold them accountable to our people. The sovereign Filipino people should be assured that if their right to life and liberty is threatened or violated, they will find vindication in our courts of justice."

A.M. No. 07-9-12-SC, The Rule on Writ of Amparo
The Resolution and the Rule on the Writ of Amparo gave legal birth to Puno's brainchild. No filing or legal fees are required for Amparo which took effect on October 24 in time for the 62nd anniversary of the United Nations. Puno also stated that the court would soon issue rules on the writ of habeas data and  the implementing guidelines for habeas corpus. The petition for the writ of amparo may be filed "on any day and at any time" with the Regional Trial Court, or with the Sandiganbayan, the Court of Appeals, and the Supreme Court. The interim reliefs under amparo are: temporary protection order (TPO), inspection order (IO), production order (PO), and witness protection order (WPO, RA 6981).

International criticism

On September 28, 2007, the Asian Human Rights Commission (AHRC) criticized the Writ of Amparo and Habeas Data (Philippines) for being insufficient: "Though it responds to practical areas it is still necessary that further action must be taken in addition to this. The legislative bodies, House of Representatives and Senate, should also initiate its own actions promptly and without delay. They must enact laws which ensure protection of rights—laws against torture and enforced disappearance and laws to afford adequate legal remedies to victims." AHRC objected since the writ failed to protect non-witnesses, even if they too face threats or risk to their lives.

Year two
The Puno court held its first multisectoral meeting in 2007 to address the issue of extrajudicial killings and forced disappearances in the Philippines. Puno announced that his Court would hold the 2nd summit, dubbed as "Forum on Increasing Access to Justice: Bridging Gaps and Removing Roadblocks," which were held simultaneously in 3 venues in Luzon, the Visayas and Mindanao from June 30 to July 1, 2008 via videoconferencing. The "Access to Justice for the Poor Project" was implemented on June 30, 2008 in 36 municipalities in the 15 poorest provinces, with the assistance of the Department of Social Welfare and Development (DSWD), Department of Interior and Local Government (DILG), the Department of Justice (DOJ) and the Alternative Law Groups Inc. The forum "Increasing Access to Justice" found that aside from poverty, exorbitant legal fees and the infrequent use of Tagalog during court hearings also affected judicial access.

Justice on Wheels (JOW) project
Puno and Alfredo Lim, on July 9, 2008, re-launched the Supreme Court's Justice on Wheels (JOW) Project, to improve access of  justice to the poor, specifically, those who are above 70 years, and detainees whose cases had dragged for longer periods than  prescribed by law. The justice-on-wheels program, borrowed from Guatemala justice system, was first launched in the Philippines on 2004 with World Bank and Asian Development Bank funds.  4 buses were converted into mobile courtrooms, to have served Manila and other regions. The Manila City Jail was built for only 1,000 inmates but was crammed with 4,602.

Case Management Information System (CMIS)
The United States donated 50 computer units and other related equipment to the High Tribunal during the July 23, 2008 launching of the Case Management Information System (CMIS) by Reynato Puno and Kristie Kenney, to reduce the judiciary's case backlog and congested dockets. The computers are part of the US $650,000 US Agency for International Development (Usaid) grant for the CMIS,  "to develop the software, build the information structure, for technical assistance and training of the justices and court personnel (of the SC, Court of Tax Appeals, Court of Appeals and the Sandiganbayan)."

Puno said: "We have our zero backlog program; we continue to review, revise and simplify the Rules of Court; we have established special courts, etc." Rule of Law Effectiveness (RoLE) Project of CMIS aims "to (1) reduce delay and prevent case congestion, as well as to generally speed up the pace of litigation, (2) strengthen judicial accountability and its integrity infrastructure, (3) enhance the capacity of Justices to manage caseload more efficiently and in a more convenient manner, (4) improve access to justice and public access to relevant information on cases, and (5) improve capacities for sound oversight planning, monitoring, and evaluation of court operations and performance and support better supervision of court operations."

Small Claims Court Pilot Project
On September 30, 2008, Puno officially launched the Small Claims Court Pilot Project, the "Rule of Procedure for Small Claims Cases" (AM No. 08-8-7-SC), effective in 22 pilot courts, per A.M. No. 141-2008. 70% of Metro Manila Metropolitan Trial Courts' case loads consist of small claims cases, filed by indigents. The new Rule now provides for "an inexpensive and expeditious means to settle actions before first-level courts, excluding Sharia ( Circuit Courts, for money claims not exceeding Ph P100,000.00. No attorneys are allowed and user-friendly forms are provided. Decisions are also required to be rendered on the first day of hearing. The decision in a small claims case shall be final and unappealable, except extra-ordinary appeals through certiorari." The Rule was promulgated by the Supreme Court of the Philippines pursuant to its "Increasing Access to Justice Program" with support funds from the United States Agency for International Development and the American Bar Association–Rule of Law Initiative.

University of the Philippines Board of Regents

Puno was re-appointed to his second term as a member of the University of the Philippines Board of Regents and received sums of money until September 30, 2014.

References

External links
Supreme Court of the Philippines
CJ's official profile Manila Times
Chief Justice Puno: Times Person of the Year Manila Times
 www.gmanews.tv, List of 15 JUDGES KILLED SINCE 1999
List of 15 JUDGES KILLED SINCE 1999 Manila Times
 A.M. No. 08-8-7-SC, RULE OF PROCEDURE FOR SMALL CLAIMS CASES, EFFECTIVE OCTOBER 1, 2008
 Small Claims Court Pilot Project Launched

1940 births
Living people
Associate Justices of the Supreme Court of the Philippines
Chief justices of the Supreme Court of the Philippines
Filipino Freemasons
20th-century Filipino judges
Grand Crosses of the Order of Lakandula
Justices of the Court of Appeals of the Philippines
Kapampangan people
People from Manila
UC Berkeley School of Law alumni
University of the Philippines Diliman alumni
University of the Philippines College of Law alumni
21st-century Filipino judges